Eleiotis is a genus of flowering plants in the legume family, Fabaceae. It belongs to the subfamily Faboideae. It is native to India, Sri Lanka and Myanmar. Species within this genus include Eleiotis monophyllos (or Eleiotis sonoria) and Eleiotis rottleri.

References

Desmodieae
Fabaceae genera